The 1957 Philadelphia Eagles season was their 25th in the league. They improved on their previous output of 3–8–1, winning six games. The team failed to qualify for the playoffs for the eighth consecutive season.

Offseason

NFL Draft 
The 1957 NFL Draft was held on November 27, 1956. This was before the end of the NFL Season and the between time of NCAA College football season end and the college bowl games. The draft once again was 30 rounds long, 12 teams picking, and a total of 360 players selected. This again was a year that there was a Lottery bonus pick. This year's team to get the overall number 1 pick in the draft was the Green Bay Packers that selected, 1956 Heisman Trophy winner, Paul Hornung
who was a Halfback out of Notre Dame

3–8–1

Player selections

Schedule

Standings

Roster 
(All time List of Philadelphia Eagles players in franchise history)

 + = Was a Starter in the Pro-Bowl

Postseason 
Head Coach Hugh Devore struggled during his two seasons in the City of Brotherly Love, compiling a mark of 7–16–1. The poor record led to Devore's firing on January 11, 1958. Despite adding assistants such as former New York Giants head coach Steve Owen.

References 

Philadelphia Eagles seasons
Philadelphia Eagles
Philadelphia Eagles